The 2020 Alabama Crimson Tide football team represented the University of Alabama in the 2020 NCAA Division I FBS football season. This was the Crimson Tide's 126th overall season, 87th as a member of the Southeastern Conference (SEC), and 29th within the SEC Western Division. They played their home games at Bryant–Denny Stadium in Tuscaloosa, Alabama, and were led by 14th-year head coach Nick Saban (with second-year offensive coordinator Steve Sarkisian serving as acting coach for Game 8, against Auburn, due to COVID-19 protocols).

They finished the season undefeated with a record of 13–0 (11–0 in the SEC) and as national champions. Looking to build on the successes of the 2019 campaign, Alabama entered the 2020 season as the favorite to win the Western Division and meet the Florida Gators in the 2020 SEC Championship Game. Alabama closed the regular season with a 11–0 record including five wins against Top 25-ranked teams—and met the Gators for the SEC Championship in a rematch of the 2016 contest. Alabama was victorious by a final score of 52–46 to capture their 9th SEC championship title. The following day, final College Football Playoff (CFP) standings were unveiled. No. 1 ranked Alabama would meet No. 4 ranked Notre Dame for the Rose Bowl game in a rematch of the 2013 contest, defeated the Fighting Irish 31–14 to meet No. 3 ranked Ohio State Buckeyes for the College Football Playoff National Championship Game in a rematch of their 2015 contest. In the College Football Playoff National Championship, the Crimson Tide defeated the Buckeyes, 52–24, to capture their third CFP National Championship title in seven years. The victory over Ohio State gave Alabama their 18th national championship in football (their 13th wire service title since the AP Poll began in 1936) and their tenth perfect season since 1925.

The season marked the first time a wide receiver at Alabama won the Heisman Trophy, as DeVonta Smith won the award over several finalists including Clemson Tigers quarterback Trevor Lawrence. In addition to the Heisman, Smith won numerous other awards, including the Maxwell Award and the Biletnikoff Award. 
Other award winners included quarterback Mac Jones (Davey O’Brien Award and Johnny Unitas Golden Arm Award), running back Najee Harris (Doak Walker Award), Alex Leatherwood (Outland Trophy), Landon Dickerson (Rimington Trophy), the offensive line (Joe Moore Award), and offensive coordinator Steve Sarkisian (Broyles Award). Six players were named to various All-America Teams with Patrick Surtain II, DeVonta Smith, Alex Leatherwood, Landon Dickerson, and Najee Harris as unanimous selections and Mac Jones as a consensus selection.

The team finished the 2020 season with a final ranking of No. 1 in both the AP and Coaches' Polls.

Because of their dominance of their all SEC schedule with multiple ranked opponents, and the fact that they finished with three Heisman Trophy candidates, several pundits have called the team the greatest in college football history with ESPN citing them as the greatest team of the playoff era.

Previous season
In 2019, the Crimson Tide began the year ranked second in the AP Poll and were favorites to repeat as SEC champions. The Tide won their first eight games of the season, but third-ranked Alabama fell 41–46 in a highly anticipated match-up with the second-ranked LSU Tigers, who went on to win the 2020 College Football Playoff National Championship 42–25 against the Clemson Tigers. The Tide went on to win their next two games but ended up falling 45–48 to their rival, the Auburn Tigers, in their final regular season game on a missed field goal that would have sent the game into overtime. This ensured that Alabama would not make the College Football Playoff for the first time since its inception in 2014. In the postseason, the Crimson Tide were selected to play against the Michigan Wolverines in the 2020 Citrus Bowl, which they won 35–16. This was the Tide's first bowl game since 2010 that was not a New Year's Six bowl or BCS National Championship. The Tide finished the season ranked #8 in both the AP and the Coaches Poll.

Offseason

Position key

Offseason departures
Six Alabama players with remaining eligibility declared early for the 2020 NFL Draft. In addition, 14 seniors from the 2019 team graduated.

Recruiting

Transfers
Outgoing

Incoming

2020 NFL draft

NFL Combine

Team players drafted into the NFL

Returning starters

Offense

Defense

Special teams

Preseason

Award watch lists 
Listed in the order that they were released

SEC Media Days
In the preseason media poll, Alabama was predicted to win the West Division and the Conference Championship Game.

Preseason All-SEC teams
The Crimson Tide placed 11 players (at 13 positions) on the 2020 Preseason SEC Team as selected by SEC coaches and 13 players (at 15 positions) on the 2020 Preseason SEC Team as selected by SEC media.

Offense

1st team

Najee Harris – RB (Coaches, Media)

DeVonta Smith – WR (Coaches, Media)

Jaylen Waddle – WR (Coaches, Media)

Alex Leatherwood – OL (Coaches, Media)

Landon Dickerson – OL (Coaches, Media)

2nd team

Deonte Brown - OL (Coaches, Media)

3rd team

Mac Jones - QB (Media)

Evan Neal - OL (Coaches, Media)

Landon Dickerson - C (Coaches, Media)

Defense

1st team

LaBryan Ray - DL (Coaches, Media)

Dylan Moses – LB (Coaches, Media)

Patrick Surtain II - DB (Coaches, Media)

3rd team

DJ Dale - DL (Media)

Josh Jobe - DB (Coaches)

Specialists

1st team

Jaylen Waddle – RS (Coaches, Media)

Jaylen Waddle - AP (Media)

Personnel

Coaching staff

Graduate assistants
Tino Sunseri
 Andy Kwon
Max Bullough
 Jake Long
Analysts

 Dean Altobelli
Major Applewhite 
Javier Arenas
 Bert Biffani
 Rob Ezell
 Johnathan Galante
Butch Jones
Shiloh Keo
 A. J. Milwee
Alex Mortensen
Nick Perry
 Patrick Reilly
 Gordon Steele 
Mike Stoops
Charlie Strong

Roster

Depth chart

 
True Freshman
Double Position :

Schedule

Spring game
The Crimson Tide were scheduled to hold spring practices in March and April 2020 with the  Alabama football spring game, "A-Day" to take place in Tuscaloosa, AL on April 18. However, due to the COVID-19 pandemic, the events were canceled.

Regular season
Alabama originally announced its 2020 football schedule on August 7, 2019. The planned schedule consisted of 7 home games, 4 away games, and 1 neutral site game for the regular season.

The COVID-19 pandemic upended this schedule. On July 30, the SEC announced that its non-conference games would be canceled and its teams would play a schedule of ten conference games. This eliminated the Crimson Tide's scheduled  non-conference games against Georgia State, Kent State, USC and UT Martin. Per the new schedule, Alabama was set to host five SEC conference opponents:   Georgia, Kentucky, Mississippi State (rivalry),
Texas A&M, and arch-rival Auburn for the 85th Iron Bowl to close out the regular season on the road.  Alabama was to travel to five SEC opponents: Arkansas,  Ole Miss (rivalry), Missouri, Tennessee (Third Saturday of October) and rival LSU (rivalry) to close out the SEC regular season on the road. Alabama was not scheduled to play SEC East opponents Florida, South Carolina, and Vanderbilt in the 2020 regular season. The Crimson Tide's bye week was scheduled during Week 7 (on November 7).

Schedule Source:

Game summaries

at Missouri Tigers

Sources:

No. 13 Texas A&M Aggies

Sources:

at Ole Miss Rebels

Sources:

No. 3 Georgia Bulldogs

Sources:

at Tennessee Volunteers

Sources:

Mississippi State Bulldogs

Sources:

Statistics

Kentucky Wildcats

Sources:

No. 22 Auburn Tigers

Steve Sarkisian served as interim head coach for the Iron Bowl after Nick Saban had to be quarantined due to COVID-19 protocols.

Sources:

at LSU Tigers

Sources:

at Arkansas Razorbacks

Sources:

vs. No. 7 Florida Gators

Sources:

vs. No. 4 Notre Dame Fighting Irish

Sources:

vs. No. 3 Ohio State Buckeyes

Sources:

Rankings

Statistics

Scoring

Scores by quarter (non-conference opponents)

Scores by quarter (SEC opponents)

Scores by quarter (All opponents)

Awards and honors

DeVonta Smith
 Heisman Trophy
 Maxwell Award
 Walter Camp Award
 Fred Biletnikoff Award
 Paul Hornung Award
 Associated Press College Football Player of the Year
 Sporting News College Football Player of the Year
 SEC Offensive Player of the Year

Mac Jones
 Davey O’Brien Award
 Johnny Unitas Golden Arm Award
 Manning Award

Najee Harris
 Doak Walker Award

Alex Leatherwood
 Outland Trophy
 Jacobs Blocking Trophy

Landon Dickerson
 Rimington Trophy
 Jacobs Blocking Trophy

Thomas Fletcher
 Patrick Mannelly Award

Patrick Surtain II
 SEC Defensive Player of the Year

Offensive Line
 Joe Moore Award

John Metchie III
 Jon Cornish Trophy

Coaches

Nick Saban
 Paul “Bear” Bryant Award

Steve Sarkisian
 Broyles Award

All Americans

Unanimous Selection

 Najee Harris (AFCA, AP, CBS, ESPN, FWAA, Phil Steele, TSN, WCFF)
 DeVonta Smith (AFCA, AP, Athletic, CBS, ESPN, FWAA, Phil Steele, TSN, USAT, WCFF)
 Landon Dickerson (AFCA, AP, CBS, ESPN, FWAA, Phil Steele, TSN, WCFF)
 Alex Leatherwood (AFCA, AP, Athletic, CBS, ESPN, FWAA, Phil Steele, TSN, USAT, WCFF)
 Patrick Surtain II (AFCA, AP, Athletic, CBS, ESPN, FWAA, Phil Steele, TSN, USAT, WCFF)

Consensus Selection

 Mac Jones (AFCA, AP, Athletic, ESPN, TSN, USAT, WCFF)

Other Selections

 Will Reichard (CBS)
 Thomas Fletcher (Phil Steele)

All-SEC

First Team

QB- Mac Jones

RB- Najee Harris

WR- DeVonta Smith

C- Landon Dickerson

OL- Alex Leatherwood

DT- Christian Barmore

CB- Patrick Surtain II

Second Team

OL- Deonte Brown (AP: 2, Coaches: 1)

LB- Dylan Moses (Coaches: 1)

LB- Christopher Allen (Coaches: 2)

LB- Will Anderson Jr. (AP: 2)

DB- Malachi Moore

KR- Jaylen Waddle (Coaches: 2)

Players drafted into the NFL

Media affiliates

Radio
 WTID (FM) (Tide 102.9) – Nationwide (Dish Network, Sirius XM, TuneIn radio and iHeartRadio)

TV
CBS Family – CBS 42 (CBS), CBS Sports Network 
ESPN/ABC Family – ABC 33/40 (ABC), ABC, ESPN, ESPN2, ESPNU, ESPN+, SEC Network)
FOX Family – WBRC (FOX), FOX/FS1, FSN
NBC – WVTM-TV, NBC Sports, NBCSN

References

Alabama
Alabama Crimson Tide football seasons
College Football Playoff National Champions
Southeastern Conference football champion seasons
Rose Bowl champion seasons
College football undefeated seasons
Alabama Crimson Tide football